The Otto-Naegeli-Preis is a Swiss award for medical research that is awarded every two years. It is one of the most prestigious Swiss medical awards and is given with an award sum of 200,000 Swiss Francs. It was established in 1960 and is named after Otto Naegeli, a former professor of internal medicine at the University of Zurich.

Awardees

The Awardees of the prize are the following:

References

External links 
 Official Website

Awards established in 1960
Science and technology in Switzerland
Science and technology awards
Swiss awards